Credo Fitch Harris (1847 - 1956) was a journalist, novelist, and radio station manager in the United States. He lived in Kentucky and worked at WHAS in Louisville. The University of Louisville has a photograph of him.

The 1918 film One Dollar Bid was an adaptation of his novel Toby.

Bibliography
Toby; A Novel of Kentucky (1912)
Motor Rambles in Italy (1912)
Sunlight Patch (1915)
Where the Souls of Men are Calling (1918)
Wings of the Wind (1920)
Microphone Memoirs; of the Horse and Buggy Days of Radio (1937), an autobiography

References

External links
Findagrave entry

1847 births
1956 deaths
Writers from Louisville, Kentucky